Frances Rowe (26 June 1913 – 31 August 1988) was an English stage, film and television actress.

Early years
Rowe was born in Preston, Lancashire, the daughter of a parson, and educated at Channing School For Girls in Highgate and then went on to study at Newnham College, Cambridge.

Stage
Rowe's acting career started in the Marlowe Society, Cambridge. She then worked in repertory theatre at Newcastle, Coventry, Harrogate, Worthing, Dundee and Windsor.

She appeared in many theatrical productions both in London's West End and also in the USA. Her American stage debut was in Man and Superman. In 1951 she was awarded the Clarence Derwent Award (her real name Frances Rowe is listed). She played the part of Alex Cornwall in Who Goes There!. In 1955 she starred in the J.B. Priestley play Mr. Kettle and Mrs. Moon.

Radio
Rowe made her American radio debut on Grand Central Station.

Television
Rowe's television work included Love Story, Rogues' Gallery, Vanity Fair, The Mill on the Floss (1965 TV adaptation of the book) and as Emily Forsyte in the 1967 TV series The Forsyte Saga. In later years, her most famous roles were that of Nancy Penrose, the mother of Hester played by Julia McKenzie in the ITV sitcom Fresh Fields, (1984–86) and Vera Polling in After Henry (TV series) (1988). She was also in the Tales of the Unexpected episode What Have You Been up to Lately?. (series 5-episode 13) She also starred in an episode of Upstairs Downstairs as the Duchess of Mitcham in the episode The Hero's Farewell.

Personal life
Rowe married actor Clive Morton when in her forties.

Filmography

Radio appearances

References

External links

1913 births
1988 deaths
English stage actresses
English television actresses
English film actresses
Alumni of Newnham College, Cambridge
20th-century English actresses